Jeremy Harris may refer to:

 Jeremy Harris (politician), (born 1950), American politician, Mayor of Honolulu (1994–2004)
 Jeremy Harris (American football) (born 1991) American football cornerback
 Jeremy Harris (sailor) (born 1942) British sailor
 Jeremy Harris (basketball) (born 1996) American basketball player
 Jeremy O. Harris, American playwright